Joel Berti (born December 17, 1971) is an American actor acting coach and photographer. He is best known for his role as William Chandler on MyNetworkTV telenovela, Fashion House. He is the brother of Chiara Jude Berti, born in New York City, New York in 1977, who appeared on Season 3 of Big Brother, for which she created some dramatic content. In 2015, Joel was Lady Gaga's acting coach for American Horror Story: Hotel, where she went on to win the 2016 Golden Globe for best performance in a limited series.

Filmography
 Beer Friday (2007) (V) .... Kyle
 Fashion House (15 episodes, 2006) .... William Chandler
 Fish Without a Bicycle (2003) .... Aaron
 Jack Woody (2003) .... Blain
 Friends (1 episode, 2002) .... Guy in Coffee Shop
 Inside the Osmonds (2001) (TV) .... Alan Osmond
 Touched by an Angel (1 episode, 2000) .... Zach
 Pensacola: Wings of Gold (1 episode, 2000) .... Capt. Joseph 'Ski' Zabronski
 Pacific Blue (2 episodes, 1997–2000) .... Donny Lynch
 Martial Law (1 episode, 1999) .... Patrick
 Rude Awakening (1 episode, 1999) .... Brian
 Michael Landon, the Father I Knew (1999) (TV) .... Michael Landon Jr.
 Silk Stalkings (1 episode, 1997) .... Mark Stavros
 USA High (1 episode, 1997) .... Paul Ember
 Social Studies (1997) TV series (unknown episodes) ....
 Saved by the Bell: Wedding in Las Vegas (1994) (TV) .... Red Team Guy #2
 Search and Rescue (1994) (TV) ....

External links

Living people
1971 births
21st-century American male actors
20th-century American male actors